The Remix (stylized in all caps) is the debut remix album by American singer Ariana Grande, released under her Japanese name, アリアナ・グランデ. It features fifteen remixes of her singles from her first two studio albums: Yours Truly (2013) and My Everything (2014). It was released exclusively in Japan on May 25, 2015 and peaked at number 32 on the Oricon Albums Chart.

Track listing

Charts

Release history

References

2015 remix albums
Ariana Grande albums
Republic Records albums